Thiota (847 AD) was a heretical Christian prophetess of the ninth century. She was originally from Alemannia (then part of East Francia), and in 847 she began prophesying that the world would end that year.

Her story is known from the Annales Fuldenses which record that she disturbed the diocese of Bishop Salomon, that is, the Diocese of Constance, before arriving in Mainz. A large number of men and women were persuaded by her "presumption" as well as even some clerics. In fear, many gave her gifts and sought prayers. Finally, the bishops of Gallia Belgica ordered her to attend a synod in St Alban's church in Mainz. She was eventually forced to confess that she had only made up her predictions at the urging of a priest and for lucrative gain. She was publicly flogged and stripped of her ministry, which the Fuldensian annalist says she had taken up "unreasonably ... against the customs of the church." Shamed, she ceased to prophesy thereafter.

References     
 The Annals of Fulda. (Manchester Medieval series, Ninth-Century Histories, Volume II.) Reuter, Timothy (trans.) Manchester: Manchester University Press, 1992.
Landes, Richard. Heaven on Earth: The Variety of the Millennial Experience. New York: Oxford University Press, 2011), pp. 81-83.
 Palmer, James. The Apocalypse in the Early Middle Ages. Cambridge: Cambridge University Press, 2015. 

9th-century apocalypticists
9th-century Christians
9th-century people from East Francia
Women Christian religious leaders
Women from the Carolingian Empire
9th-century women